See also Linia, Corfu.

Linia is a town in Chad, lying 30km east of N'Djamena.  It is known for its large market.

Populated places in Chad